The 1984 United States presidential election in New Hampshire took place on November 6, 1984, as part of the 1984 United States presidential election, which was held throughout all 50 states and D.C. Voters chose four representatives, or electors to the Electoral College, who voted for president and vice president.

New Hampshire overwhelmingly voted for incumbent Republican President Ronald Reagan of California over his Democratic challenger, former Vice President Walter Mondale of Minnesota. Reagan ran with incumbent Vice President George H.W. Bush of Texas, while Mondale's running mate was Congresswoman Geraldine Ferraro of New York.

Reagan took 68.66% of the vote to Mondale's 30.95%, a margin of 37.71%. Reagan also swept every county in the Granite State with over 60% of the vote. His victory in the popular vote made New Hampshire his fifth strongest state in the 1984 election after Utah, Idaho, Nebraska and Wyoming.

New Hampshire weighed in as about 19% more Republican than the national average.

Reagan's 68.66% of the vote in New Hampshire is tied with William McKinley's 68.66% of the vote in the state in the 1896 election as the highest percentage of the vote any Republican presidential candidate has ever received in the Granite State, although McKinley did beat Reagan in terms of margin, winning by 42.78% versus Reagan's 37.71%. As of 2020, this remains the last time that an incumbent Republican president has carried New Hampshire.

Results

Results by county

See also
 Presidency of Ronald Reagan
 United States presidential elections in New Hampshire

References

1984
New Hampshire
1984 New Hampshire elections